Habrochloa is a genus of African plants in the grass family. The only known species is Habrochloa bullockii native to Cameroon, Tanzania, Malawi, Zambia, and Zimbabwe.

References

Chloridoideae
Monotypic Poaceae genera
Flora of Africa